Mary Agnes Stump Taylor (1885-1976) was an American bryologist noted for collecting and identifying many species of bryophytes across North America.  Her collection of around 8,000 plants was so extensive that it has been used to identify the range of plants several decades after their original collection.

Works

References 

1885 births
American women scientists
American botanists
bryologists
Year of death missing
Women bryologists
American women botanists